Chris Crutchfield is an American basketball coach who is the current head coach of the Omaha Mavericks men's basketball team.

Playing career
Crutchfield was a two-sport athlete at Omaha, where he was a member of the basketball and football teams.

Coaching career
Beginning his coaching career at his alma mater Omaha, Crutchfield would then move to UTSA before landing at Tyler Junior College where he would be an assistant, then head coach from 1999 to 2001 where he would compile a 35–29 overall record. Crutchfield would then join Lou Henson's staff at New Mexico State from 2001 to 2005 before assistant coaching stops at TCU and Oral Roberts.

In 2011, Crutchfield landed on Lon Kruger's coaching staff at Oklahoma where he was a part of six NCAA Tournament appearances, including the Sooners' 2016 Final Four team. In 2019, Crutchfield would join Eric Musselman at Arkansas for a single season before taking the head coaching position at East Central, a Division II institution. In his lone season at the helm of East Central, Crutchfield guided the team to a 10–9 mark before heading back to the Division I ranks as an assistant under Dana Altman at Oregon.

On March 18, 2022, Crutchfield was named the 22nd head coach in Omaha men's basketball history, replacing Derrin Hansen.

Head coaching record

References

Living people
American men's basketball coaches
Omaha Mavericks men's basketball players
Nebraska–Omaha Mavericks football players
Basketball players from Kentucky
People from Hopkinsville, Kentucky
Omaha Mavericks men's basketball coaches
UTSA Roadrunners men's basketball coaches
New Mexico State Aggies men's basketball coaches
TCU Horned Frogs men's basketball coaches
Oral Roberts Golden Eagles men's basketball coaches
Oklahoma Sooners men's basketball coaches
Oregon Ducks men's basketball coaches
East Central Tigers men's basketball coaches
Year of birth missing (living people)